The Men's Individual Time Trial at the 1999 World Cycling Championships was held on Thursday 7 October 1999 in Treviso, Italy, over a total distance of 50.8 kilometres. There were a total number of 59 starters, with three non-starters.

Final classification

References
Results

Men's Time Trial
UCI Road World Championships – Men's time trial